Theodor Hoffmann (5 July 1940 – 31 October 2011) was a German football player. He spent eight seasons in the Bundesliga with VfB Stuttgart. The best finish in the league he achieved was fifth place.

References

External links
 
 Theodor Hoffmann at rapidarchiv.at 

1940 births
2011 deaths
German footballers
VfB Stuttgart players
SK Rapid Wien players
Bundesliga players
Association football midfielders
20th-century German people